Arlindo Gomes Semedo (born 17 November 1977), known as Cafú, is a Cape Verdean former professional footballer who played as a forward.

After playing in his country of birth for Belenenses and Boavista, amassing Primeira Liga totals of 153 games and 17 goals over seven seasons, he went on to have a brief spell in Germany with Freiburg. He moved to Cyprus already in his 30s, where he remained for five years in representation of several teams. 

Internationally, Cafú played for Cape Verde.

Club career
Cafú was born in Lisbon, Portugal. During his early career he played for Almada AC, Amora FC, C.F. Os Belenenses – with which he made his Primeira Liga debut in the 1999–2000 season– and Boavista FC, appearing in six games in the Porto team's quarter-final run in the UEFA Cup in 2002–03 but starting rarely in his three and-a-half-year stint with the club.

In January 2006, Cafú moved to Sportfreunde Siegen in Germany's second division, his five league goals not being enough to avoid relegation (as last). He subsequently stayed in that level and joined SC Freiburg, where he would appear sparingly over one and a half years.

Again in the January transfer window, Cafú joined Cyprus' AC Omonia. After one-and-a-half seasons he moved sides but stayed in the country, joining Anorthosis Famagusta F.C. on a free transfer in the summer of 2009; in the start of his second season, in the 2010–11 UEFA Europa league third qualifying round, he scored a hat-trick against Cercle Brugge KSV (3–1 home win), being essential in a 3–2 aggregate victory and play-off stage qualification.

In his two-year spell with Anorthosis, Cafú scored always in double digits but his team came out empty in silverware, respectively finishing second and third in the Cypriot First Division. In June 2011, aged 33, he was released, signing shortly after with AEL Limassol.

Cafú returned to Portugal after leaving Alki Larnaca FC, going on to spend one season apiece in the Segunda Liga with Académico de Viseu FC, C.D. Feirense and S.C. Freamunde and scoring a career-best 15 goals (17 across all competitions) during his spell at the first club.

References

External links

1977 births
Living people
Citizens of Cape Verde through descent
Portuguese sportspeople of Cape Verdean descent
Cape Verdean footballers
Portuguese footballers
Footballers from Lisbon
Association football forwards
Primeira Liga players
Liga Portugal 2 players
Segunda Divisão players
Amora F.C. players
C.F. Os Belenenses players
Boavista F.C. players
Académico de Viseu F.C. players
C.D. Feirense players
S.C. Freamunde players
S.C. Salgueiros players
F.C. Maia players
2. Bundesliga players
Sportfreunde Siegen players
SC Freiburg players
Cypriot First Division players
AC Omonia players
Anorthosis Famagusta F.C. players
AEL Limassol players
Alki Larnaca FC players
Cape Verde international footballers
Cape Verdean expatriate footballers
Portuguese expatriate footballers
Expatriate footballers in Germany
Expatriate footballers in Cyprus
Portuguese expatriate sportspeople in Germany
Cape Verdean expatriate sportspeople in Cyprus
Portuguese expatriate sportspeople in Cyprus